Angadikkappurathu is a 1985 Indian Malayalam film,  directed by I. V. Sasi and produced by Rosamma George. The film stars Mammootty, Mohanlal, Kaviyoor Ponnamma and Adoor Bhasi in the lead roles. The film has musical score by Shyam.

Plot

Cast

Mammootty as Jose
Mohanlal as Babu
Kaviyoor Ponnamma as Rosi
Adoor Bhasi as Lazar
Mahalakshmi (Kannada actress) as Neena
Rahman as Charley
Swapna as Shirley Fernadez
T. G. Ravi as Alex
Thiruthiyadu Vilasini
Thodupuzha Vasanthy as Beevi
Sabitha Anand as Sainaba
Achankunju as Saithakka
Manavalan Joseph as Fernandez
Krishna Kurup as Mooppan
Balan K. Nair as Khan Sayib
Vincent as Police Inspector
Thrissur Elsy as Jose's mother
Roshni as Rosal
Nellikkode Bhaskaran as Nambiar
Kuthiravattom Pappu as Pappu
Santhosh as Raghu
K. P. Ummer as Dasappan
Lissy as Rathi
Maniyanpilla Raju as Vasu
Kundara Johnny as Athani Varghese
 Y. Vijaya as Rajamma
Beena Sabu as Kalyani
P. K. Radhadevi as Mary
Kozhikode Sharada as Khadeejathatha

Soundtrack
The music was composed by Shyam and the lyrics were written by Bichu Thirumala.

References

External links
 

1985 films
1980s Malayalam-language films
Films directed by I. V. Sasi